Perry Alvin Charles Reed (January 22, 1871 – April 4, 1943) was a politician in the State of Nebraska.

Biography
Reed was born on January 22, 1871, to John P. and Emma J. Reed in or near Monroe, Wisconsin. They moved to Nebraska in 1875. On March 11, 1896, he married Abbie L. Westcott. He was a farmer by trade and a member of the Odd Fellows. He died of pneumonia in 1943.

Political career
Reed served in the Nebraska State Senate from 1919 to 1933. Prior to that, he had served in the Nebraska State House of Representatives. He was a Republican.

References

External links
 
 The Political Graveyard

People from Monroe, Wisconsin
Nebraska state senators
Members of the Nebraska House of Representatives
Farmers from Nebraska
1871 births
1943 deaths
Deaths from pneumonia in Missouri